Maurice Darnell Ager (born February 9, 1984) is an American former professional basketball player. He played at the collegiate level for the Michigan State Spartans from 2002 until 2006, and earned a spot on the 19-and-under USA basketball team in the summer of 2004. As a junior, Ager led the Spartans to the NCAA Final Four in 2005, averaging 14 points per game. As a senior, Ager led the Big Ten in scoring, averaging just below 20 points per contest, and participated in the dunk contest at the 2006 Final Four. Ager was selected by the Dallas Mavericks in the NBA draft with the 28th overall pick. In 2008, Ager was included in a trade between the Dallas Mavericks and New Jersey Nets.

Ager is also a music producer and was considered for a Grammy Award for his song "Far From Home." Ager released his debut album, Moe Town Vol. 1, in 2013. In 2014, Ager created "Moe Ager Hoop School," a basketball enrichment program which serves to develop young, up-and-coming basketball players worldwide. Ager has provided his program all over the world in areas including America, Canada, Spain, China, South America, Africa, and is currently active in Hanoi, Vietnam.

Basketball career

College
Ager attended Michigan State from 2002–2006. In his freshman year, he averaged 6.7 points per game as the Spartans advanced to the Elite Eight before losing to Texas. As a sophomore in 2004, he increased his scoring average to 8.5 points per game while averaging 22.5 minutes per game.

In 2005, Ager was the top scorer for Michigan State, averaging 14.1 points per game while averaging 26.3 minutes per game. He led the Spartans to the Final Four by defeating Kentucky in a double-overtime game in the Elite Eight. He was named to the Austin All-Regional team after averaging 16.8 points and 5 rebounds a game. Ager scored 24 points against North Carolina in the Final Four, but the Spartans lost to the eventual national champions.

Ager again led the Spartans in scoring in 2006, as he averaged 19.3 points per game as a senior. On November 22, 2005, at the Maui Invitational Tournament, Ager faced off against Gonzaga's Adam Morrison. Down by three, Ager sank a three-point shot at the buzzer to send the game into overtime. Despite Ager's team-high 36 points, Gonzaga knocked off the Spartans in triple overtime 109–106. The next day Ager led the Spartans with 20 points to defeat Arizona 74–71 in overtime.

Ager finished his career with 1,554 points with the Spartans.

Professional career
On June 28, 2006, Ager was selected by the Dallas Mavericks in the NBA draft with the 28th overall pick.

While with the Mavericks in 2006, Ager was assigned to the Fort Worth Flyers of the D-League. Ager would appear in 32 games in his rookie season for the Mavericks. He appeared in 12 games for the Mavericks in 2007–08. On February 19, 2008, Ager was traded by the Mavericks to the New Jersey Nets in a multi-player deal involving point guard Jason Kidd. During this time, he also played in the NBA's D-League. Ager would appear in 14 games for the Nets and 20 games in 2008–09. Following his stint with the Nets, he played in the D-League and Spain. After appearing four games for the Minnesota Timberwolves in 2010, he was waived on November 11, 2010.

NBA career statistics

Regular season 

|-
| align="left" | 
| align="left" | Dallas
| 32 || 1 || 6.7 || .314 || .333 || .606 || .7 || .2 || .1 || .1 || 2.2
|-
| align="left" | 
| align="left" | Dallas
| 12 || 3 || 6.4 || .185 || .000 || .833 || .3 || .3 || .0 || .1 || 1.3
|-
| align="left" | 
| align="left" | New Jersey
| 14 || 0 || 6.3 || .421 || .273 || .167 || .6 || .3 || .0 || .0 || 2.6
|-
| align="left" | 
| align="left" | New Jersey
| 20 || 0 || 4.9 || .349 || .000 || .500 || .5 || .2 || .1 || .1 || 1.7
|-
| align="left" | 
| align="left" | Minnesota
| 4 || 0 || 7.3 || .545 || .750 || .000 || .5 || .3 || .3 || .0 || 3.8
|-
| align="left" | Career
| align="left" |
| 82 || 4 || 6.2 || .339 || .250 || .566 || .6 || .2 || .1 || .1 || 2.1

Playoffs 

|-
| align="left" | 2007
| align="left" | Dallas
| 3 || 0 || 8.0 || .556 || .667 || .500 || 1.0 || .0 || .0 || .0 || 5.0
|-
| align="left" | Career
| align="left" |
| 3 || 0 || 8.0 || .556 || .667 || .500 || 1.0 || .0 || .0 || .0 || 5.0

Music career
In 2010 Ager created his own music production company called "Moe Ager Productions". In 2013, he was nominated for Producer of the Year at the EOTM Awards in Los Angeles. Ager received ballot consideration for the 56th Annual Grammy Awards for his single, "Far From Home." He has produced for not only himself but artists such as Royce Da 5'9, E-40, Layzie Bone, Tobe Nwigwe, Major Williams, Marcus Moody, Yukmouf, Rashaun Will, and B-Real of Cypress Hill. Ager's single, "Forever I'm a Spartan," was released as an anthem for the Michigan State University football team in 2010. Ager released 3 projects in the winter of 2018,"Moe House","Lost in Translation" and "Visa Run".

References

External links
 
 Player profile
 Former MSU basketball player  receives grammy nomination at statenews.com by Ariel Ellis, October 31, 2013

1984 births
Living people
African-American basketball players
American expatriate basketball people in Spain
Basketball players from Detroit
Real Betis Baloncesto players
Dallas Mavericks draft picks
Dallas Mavericks players
Fort Worth Flyers players
Liga ACB players
Maine Red Claws players
Michigan State Spartans men's basketball players
Minnesota Timberwolves players
New Jersey Nets players
Shooting guards
Tulsa 66ers players
American men's basketball players
21st-century African-American sportspeople
20th-century African-American people